St. Patrick: The Irish Legend is a 2000 television historical drama film about the life of Saint Patrick (AD 387–463) who was born in Wales and who brought Christianity to Ireland.

Cast
 Patrick Bergin as Saint Patrick
 Malcolm McDowell as Quentin
 Alan Bates as Calpornius, Patrick's father
 Susannah York as Concessa, Patrick's mother

See also
 List of historical drama films

External links

 
 

2000 television films
2000 films
Films based on European myths and legends
Films set in the 5th century
British historical films
2000s historical films
Films scored by Inon Zur
Cultural depictions of Saint Patrick
2000s English-language films
2000s British films
Saint Patrick's Day films